Independence High Magnet School is a senior high school in Independence, Louisiana, United States. It is a part of the Tangipahoa Parish School Board.

Athletics
Independence High Magnet athletics competes in the LHSAA.

References

External links
Independence High Magnet School

Schools in Tangipahoa Parish, Louisiana
Public high schools in Louisiana